Ỿ (lower case: ỿ), a variant of the letter Y, is a letter used by some Welsh medievalists to indicate the schwa sound of . The Unicode code point for the capital form U+1EFE; that for the small form is U+1EFF.

References

External links
 Ỿ at charbase.com

Welsh language
Latin-script letters